3050 may refer to:

In general
 3050, a number in the 3000 (number) range
 A.D. 3050, a year of the 4th millennium CE
 3050 BC, a year in the 4th millennium BCE

Roads numbered 3050
 Hawaii Route 3050, a state highway
 Louisiana Highway 3050, a state highway
 Texas Farm to Market Road 3050, a state highway
 A3050 road (Great Britain)

Other uses
 3050 Carrera, an asteroid in the Asteroid Belt, the 3050th asteroid registered
 Keisei 3050 series electric multiple unit train series
 Nagoya Municipal Subway 3050 series electric multiple unit train series

See also